Pasajero is the second solo album from OV7 member Ari Borovoy. Like his first solo disc, 2005's Ari Borovoy, the album was created during a seven-year period (2003–2010) in which OV7 had split up.  "Vivo" was the album's first single; a video was also released for the song.

Track listing
"Vivo"
"Ella"
"Pasajero"
"Para Mi"
"Llegas A Mi"
"Tengo Mucho Calor"
"No Aguanto Mas"
"Vete Muy Lejos"
"Delovers [Vivo Remix Version]"
"Para Mi [Remix Version]"

References

2008 albums